Wong Tai Sin was a Chinese Taoist Deity with the power of healing, popular in Zhejiang and Hong Kong.

Wong Tai Sin may mean or refer to:

 Wong Tai Sin, Hong Kong, an area in Hong Kong
 Wong Tai Sin District, a district in Hong Kong
 Wong Tai Sin station, a Hong Kong MTR station
 Wong Tai Sin Temple (Hong Kong)
 Tung Wah Group of Hospitals Wong Tai Sin Hospital, a Hong Kong hospital 
 The Legend of Wong Tai Sin, a TVB drama in 1986